Ark of Time is a 1997 adventure game developed by Italian studio Trecision and published in 1997 for MS-DOS by Koei. A PlayStation version was released in 1998.

Plot 
Players control Richard, a newspaper reporter whose search for a missing professor takes him around the world and entangles him in the mystery of the fate of Atlantis.

Gameplay
Ark of Time is a third-person point-and-click adventure game, with mostly inventory based puzzles.

Reception
Giving the game 80/100, Tap-Repeatedly/Four Fat Chicks complimented the game's sly sense of humor. AdventureGamers rated the game 70/100, saying "This is the worst game that I've totally enjoyed." GameSpot gave it 63/100, writing that Ark of Time was neither revolutionary or groundbreaking. Quandary gave the game 60/100, writing that the game was part of a rush of titles centering around the fabled lost city of Atlantis that were released at the time. Additionally, Quandary felt that it was surprising. Gameboomers wrote that the game was 'pretty okay'. Just Adventure felt the title was loony and offbeat. Meristration felt that while the game was competent and didn't have any serious flaws, it lacked anything that pushed the genre.

References

External links 

 PC Games review

Koei games
1997 video games
Adventure games
Point-and-click adventure games
DOS games
PlayStation (console) games
Video games developed in Italy
Video games set in 1997
Video games set in Atlantis
Video games set in London
Video games set in the Caribbean
Trecision games
Single-player video games